Catch Me If You Can is the debut studio album by British rapper Bashy, released on 1 June 2009.  Hiphop.com rated the album 'good' saying "Catch Me If You Can is a debut album that perfectly encapsulates how hip hop has become the world's local music. With vocal accents, lyrical references, swagger and varied production styles that will take a minute for the non-Brit to get their head around, much of this likable and well-intentioned set still deserves wider attention."

Bashy re-recorded the video for the single, "Who Wants to Be a Millionaire?" in July 2009 with young people taking part in creative workshops in London Borough of Newham for BBC Blast.  The students, from New Vic College, East London, were set the challenge by Blast and MTV Music Video Award winning director Jake Nava to create 3 music videos for Bashy's single.  The students, under expert supervision of director Emil Nava and Music Video Treatment writer Greta Wynn-Davies, had three days to brainstorm, write, organise props/costume, shoot and edit the music video. The 3 music videos were premiered by BBC Blast at the Mayor's Newham Show Sunday 12 July 2009 in a Q&A session with Bashy, Emil and Jake (hosted by Daniel Lambden).

Track listing
 "Catch Me If You Can"
 "Before Before"
 "Who Wants to Be a Millionaire?" (featuring Toddla T)
 "Shes a Gangsta"
 "Travel the World" (featuring Dappy)
 "Change"
 "Copycat"
 "Ransom" (featuring Wretch 32 and Scorcher)
 "Living My Dream" (featuring Angel)
 "Life"
 "Your Wish Is My Command" (featuring H-Boogie)
 "We Can Do Anything" (featuring Jamelia and Loick Essien)
 "Sorry" (featuring Zalon)
 "What About Me"
 "Day Before I Die" (featuring Charles Anonymous)
 "Kidulthood 2 Adulthood" (Bonus Track)
 "Black Boys" (featuring Loick Essien) (Bonus Track)

References

2009 debut albums
Bashy albums